Patrick Burke (born 14 February 1919, date of death unknown) was a Trinidadian cricketer. He played in one first-class match for Trinidad and Tobago in 1941/42.

See also
 List of Trinidadian representative cricketers

References

External links
 

1919 births
Year of death missing
Trinidad and Tobago cricketers